The 1991 Asian Club Championship was the 11th edition of the annual Asian club football competition hosted by Asian Football Confederation.

Al-Hilal from Saudi Arabia won the final and became the first Asian Championship winner from Saudi Arabia.

First Round

First round

Note: Pelita Jaya were subsequently suspended by the AFC due to crowd disturbances during the second leg, followed by a pitch invasion following the final whistle.

Second round

Byes:   Al Rayyan,   Al-Hilal,   Al Shabab,   Port Authority,  April 25 (drawn against  Geylang International, who withdrew)

Quarter finals
 Yomiuri FC withdrew.

Group A

Group B

Semi-finals

Third Place

Final

References 
 Asian Club Competitions 1992 at RSSSF.com

1991 in Asian football
1991